Lisa Love is the former athletic director of Arizona State University. At the time Love was one of only three female athletic directors in a Division I FBS Bowl Equity Conference of the NCAA.  Love began her administrative career at USC.  Prior to becoming an administrator, Love served as the volleyball head coach at the University of Texas at Arlington and the University of Southern California, leading her teams to the NCAA Division I Volleyball Tournament 13 times. In 2005, she was inducted into the American Volleyball Coaches Association (AVCA) Hall of Fame.

Early years
Love was a four-year starter on the Texas Tech Red Raiders women's volleyball team while attending Texas Tech University, and graduated with a bachelor's degree in physical education in 1977. In 1985 Love received her master's degree in education administration from North Texas State University (now known as the University of North Texas).

Career

Texas–Arlington
Love was named head coach of the Texas–Arlington Mavericks in 1982. During her seven seasons as head coach, Love compiled a 199–78 overall record, and was undefeated in regular season Southland Conference play. She was named Tachikara/AVCA Division I National Coach of the Year in 1988.

Southern California
Love became only the fourth head coach of the USC Trojans women's volleyball program in 1989. She held the position until 1998, and served as an associate athletic director from 1991-2001. From 2001 to 2005 Love held the position of senior associate athletics director.  As head coach, she led the Trojans to a 205–93 record, nine NCAA Division I Volleyball Tournament berths and eight finishes in the national top 15. Love became associate athletic director in 1991, while still head coach of the volleyball team. Love was named Pac-10 Coach of the Year in 1998. She also served two stints as vice president of Pac-10 Conference, 1992-92 and 2001-2002. While at USC Love served as AVCA president from 1997–98 and as the chair of the NCAA Division I Volleyball Committee.

Arizona State
Love was hired as the athletic director at Arizona State University, began her duties on July 1, 2005, and concluded her tenure on March 27, 2012. She was one of only three women to hold such a position within the continental United States. She served twice as vice president of the Pac-10, later Pac-12 Conference. Love represented the Pac-12 on both the NCAA Management Council and Leadership Council. At ASU Love was responsible for the management and development of the school's 22 sports programs.

Head coaching record

Reference:

Reference:

References

American women's volleyball players
Arizona State Sun Devils athletic directors
Living people
UT Arlington Mavericks women's volleyball coaches
Texas Tech Red Raiders women's volleyball players
University of North Texas alumni
USC Trojans women's volleyball coaches
Year of birth missing (living people)
American volleyball coaches